Federal elections were held in Belgium on 21 May 1995 to elect members of the Chamber of Representatives and Senate. The Christian People's Party (CVP) kept its position as largest party in Flanders and overall in Belgium, and Jean-Luc Dehaene (CVP) continued as Prime Minister.

On the same day, regional elections were also held. These were the first elections after the new 1993 Belgian Constitution, which turned Belgium formally into a federal state. The new Constitution also reduced the number of seats in the Chamber (from 212 to 150) and in the Senate (from 70 to 40 directly elected senators).

Results

Chamber of Representatives

Senate

Belgium
Federal
Federal elections in Belgium
Belgium